Franz Koch (Attnang, Oberösterreich 21 March 1888 - Tübingen 29 December 1969) was a German literary historian and scholar of Goethe and Schiller. He was compromised by his association with National Socialism.

References

Germanists
1888 births
1969 deaths
German male writers